Boombox Cartel is a Los Angeles-based DJ act consisting of producer Americo Garcia (of Laredo, Texas) and writing partner, Jorge Medina (of Monterrey, Mexico).

History
Americo Garcia and writing partner Jorge Medina met while in high school in Monterrey, Mexico. After graduating the two moved to St. Paul, Minnesota to study audio engineering and music production at the now-defunct McNally Smith College of Music.  After a brief stint in Minnesota they relocated to Los Angeles, California to further pursue their musical careers.

Having just arrived in LA, inspired by the cities vast diversity and multicultural influences Americo and Jorge self-released their breakout track, “B2U” featuring Ian Everson in 2015.  The track immediately garnered the attention of notable artists like Skrillex, Diplo, and Martin Garrix.

Boombox Cartel eventually signed with Diplo's label Mad Decent in 2016 and continued to develop their on-point production and sonic progression which was put on full display within the debut EP Cartel in April 2017.

Releases

References

External links
Profile on AllMusic
Artist bio on Mad Decent

Mexican DJs
Mexican electronic musicians
American electronic musicians
American dance musicians
Musicians from Los Angeles
Mad Decent artists
Electronic dance music DJs
Trap musicians (EDM)
American hip hop record producers
21st-century American musicians
1991 births
Living people